The 1982 Wyoming Cowboys football team represented the University of Wyoming as a member of the Western Athletic Conference (WAC) during the 1982 NCAA Division I-A football season. Led by second-year head coach Al Kincaid, the Cowboys compiled a record of 5–7 overall and 2–6 in conference play, placing eighth in the WAC. The team played home games at War Memorial Stadium in Laramie, Wyoming.

Schedule

References

Wyoming
Wyoming Cowboys football seasons
Wyoming Cowboys football